"Why Don't You Know" is a song by South Korean singer Chungha, featuring rapper Nucksal. The song serves as the lead single from her debut EP, Hands on Me.

Composition
"Why Don't You Know" is described as a tropical house song about unrequited love.

Promotion
Chungha has been promoting the single on music shows. Chungha also collaborated with NCT's Taeyong with a new rap lyrics on Show! Music Core.

Music video
The music video was released on 6 June 2017, and in the music video for the track, Chungha dances in a vast grassy field, sporting colorful summer outfits. As of January 2019, the music video has surpassed 20 million views on YouTube.

Charts

Weekly charts

Year-end charts

Sales

Download

|}

Accolades

References

2017 songs
2017 singles
Chungha songs
MNH Entertainment singles
Korean-language songs